James Egan may refer to:
 James Egan (artist) (1929–2017), Australian artist
 James Egan (engraver) (1799–1842), Irish engraver
 James J. Egan (1839–1914), Irish-American architect
 James Egan Moulton (1841–1909), English-born Australian Methodist minister and headmaster

See also
 Jim Egan (disambiguation)